Adela of Saluzzo (after 1055) was a northern Italian noblewoman. She was a member of the Obertenghi dynasty. Through marriage to Anselm II, Margrave of Saluzzo, she was margravine of Saluzzo.

Life
Adela's parents were Albert Azzo I, Margrave of Milan and Adela of Milan. Her brother, Albert Azzo II, succeeded their father as margrave of Milan, and was the founder of the House of Este.

Marriage and children
Adela married Anselm II, Margrave of Saluzzo, with whom she had the following children:
Otto II
Hugo II
Anselm

Notes

References
U. Brunhofer, Arduin von Ivrea. Untersuchungen zum letzten italienischen Königtum des Mittelalters (Augsburg, 1999). 
A. Thiele, Erzählende genealogische Stammtafeln zur europäischen Geschichte Band III Europäische Kaiser-, Königs- und Fürstenhäuser (R.G. Fischer Verlag, 1994).

Sources
Adele Markgräfin von Saluzzo (in German)

990s births

11th-century deaths
Year of birth uncertain
Year of death unknown
People from Saluzzo
11th-century Italian nobility
11th-century Italian women